U.S. Città di Palermo played the 2011–12 season in Serie A, the eighth consecutive season for the Sicilian club in the Italian top flight since their return to the league in 2004. The club ended the season in 16th place, the worst result in all of its last eight Serie A seasons.

The Sicilian club took part in two cup competitions, the UEFA Europa League and the Coppa Italia, being eliminated immediately in both of them.

Review and events

Following Palermo's last game of the 2010–11 season, a 3–1 loss to Internazionale in the Coppa Italia final, Chairman Maurizio Zamparini announced to have parted company with head coach Delio Rossi, and announced Stefano Pioli as new trainer the very next day. Pioli's own coaching staff will be composed by four members: assistant Giacomo Murelli, technical collaborator Davide Lucarelli, fitness coach Matteo Osti and Graziano Vinti (a past Palermo player in the 1990s) as goalkeeping coach. The club then announced to have hired Sean Sogliano as new director of football on 8 June, filling a vacancy created by the resignation of Walter Sabatini in November 2010.

As in previous seasons, Palermo also acquired a number of young international starts. Many of these acquisitions were announced before the end of the previous seasons: signings of defenders Carlos Labrín and Milan Milanović, as well as striker Pablo González, were made public already in January 2011. Later on in May, the club confirmed the acquisitions of Eros Pisano from Serie B club Varese, Israeli international Eran Zahavi from Hapoel Tel Aviv and Ádám Simon from Szombathelyi Haladás in Hungary.
In June, the club also announced the free signing of defender Mauro Cetto from Toulouse in France.

On 17 June, the club confirmed to have appointed Varese youth coach Devis Mangia at the helm of the Primavera under-19 squad, replacing Paolo Beruatto.

On 2 July, the squad officially gathered together in Verona, and on the same day, Maurizio Zamparini personally introduced new head coach Stefano Pioli to the press; on the following day, the players and non-playing staff moved to Malles Venosta, South Tyrol, for the pre-season training camp that took place until 20 July.

On 5 July, defender Andrea Mantovani joined the Palermo squad, after the Sicilian club managed to find an agreement with Chievo regarding his signing. The acquisition was formally confirmed by the club the following day, with the player signing a four-year deal with the Sicilians.

On 9 July, Palermo confirmed the acquisition of Uruguayan youngster Ignacio Lores from Defensor Sporting in a five-year deal. On 25 July, the club announced to have sold Dorin Goian to Scottish champions Rangers and Pajtim Kasami to English Premier League Fulham.

On 28 July, Palermo and Paris Saint-Germain completed the move of first-choice goalkeeper Salvatore Sirigu from Sicily to France; the same day, the rosanero made their seasonal debut, playing at home the first leg of the UEFA Europa League third preliminary round against Swiss side Thun: the game ended in a disappointing 2–2 draw thanks to an injury time free kick equalizer from veteran striker Fabrizio Miccoli. Palermo were successively eliminated on the away goals rule after only achieving a 1–1 draw in the return leg in Thun.

On 6 August, after weeks of speculation linking him to several top-ranked European clubs, Argentine playmaker Javier Pastore left Palermo in order to join Paris Saint-Germain, thus following teammate Salvatore Sirigu in France; the bid was speculated to be in the range of €43 million, a record for the rosanero. In an attempt to reply to dissatisfied supporters after the sales of top players Sirigu and Pastore and rumours of possible transfers involving other key elements, on 9 August the club published the list of all bid amounts spent in new signings during the summer transfer window, also implicitly confirming the acquisitions of Matías Silvestre from fellow islanders Catania, then formalized the very next day.

By the end of August, Palermo also sold two long-time defenders, Cesare Bovo and Mattia Cassani, loaned out respectively to Genoa and Fiorentina.

On 26 August, Palermo confirmed the acquisition of Greek international goalkeeper Alexandros Tzorvas from Panathinaikos.

On 31 August, an eventful day saw Palermo selling Italy international midfielder Antonio Nocerino to Milan and acquire three midfielders: Edgar Álvarez from Bari, Francesco Della Rocca from Bologna and Édgar Barreto from Atalanta. Later on that day, Palermo announced to have surprisingly sacked Stefano Pioli, appointing newly hired youth team coach Devis Mangia on a temporary basis. His first game in charge of team duties, played on 11 September against European powerhouse Inter, ended in an astonishing 4–3 win for the rosanero thanks to a brace from captain Fabrizio Miccoli.

Under debutant coach Mangia, Palermo won all its first five home games, defeating also Cagliari, Siena, Bologna and Lecce; such performances were not confirmed in away games, where the rosanero regularly struggled in winning points and never scored a single goal as of November 2011.

On 2 November 2011, director of football Sean Sogliano tended his resignation due to disagreements with chairman Maurizio Zamparini. He was replaced by Luca Cattani, formerly chief scout at the same club. Sogliano's resignation led to rumours regarding a possible future removal of Devis Mangia as caretaker, which was promptly dismissed two days later, when Palermo announced to have agreed a two-year contract as permanent head coach with the young tactician.

Palermo also enjoyed a string of seven consecutive home wins that ended with a 0–1 loss to Cesena on 10 December. Three days later, the rosanero were surprisingly eliminated from the Coppa Italia after losing 4–7 at home on penalties to Siena (3–3; 4–4 after extra time). A third consecutive loss, a 0–2 defeat in the Sicilian derby against Catania, led to the dismissal of Mangia and his replacement with veteran coach Bortolo Mutti. The first game under his tenure ended in a 2–2 draw at Novara, that also featured the first goals scored by Palermo in an away league fixture during the season.

In the December break, Palermo formalized the signings of attacking midfielder Franco Vázquez and striker Agon Mehmeti, who both made their debut in the first game of the year 2012, a 1–3 home loss to Napoli. Two major signings followed in January as goalkeeper Emiliano Viviano and midfielder Massimo Donati joined the rosanero squad. They made both their debut in Palermo's first win under coach Mutti, a 5–3 home win against Genoa. On 1 February, Palermo achieved a surprise 4–4 draw at San Siro against Inter, three of the goals being scored by Fabrizio Miccoli, that made him the most prolific goalscorer in the whole club history. After snatching a row of positive results, Palermo entered into another string of winless games by February, leaving the club in the second half of the league table and leaving Mutti again in a delicate position.

On 20 March 2012, Palermo announced former Italian international player Christian Panucci as the team's new team manager. This was preceded by weeks of speculation surrounding future potential investments of Arab entrepreneurs in the club, a move that was confirmed as possible by Zamparini himself between February and March. Palermo's first away win of the season finally came on 1 April, as the rosanero achieved a 3–1 victory at Stadio Renato Dall'Ara against former coach Pioli's Bologna, thus ending an 11-month winless streak. However, Palermo kept struggling in the final part of the season, and obtained mathematical safety of a Serie A place for the next season only in the 36th matchday, despite a 2–0 defeat at the hands of Napoli.

On 24 April 2012, it was confirmed Christian Panucci had resigned from his non-playing role after only one month, due to a strained relationship with chairman and owner Maurizio Zamparini.

Confirmed summer transfer market bids
In

Out

Out on loan

Confirmed winter transfer market bids
In

Out

Out on loan

Squad information
Updated 25 March 2012

|-
|colspan="14"|Players sold or loaned out during the summer transfer market:

|-
|colspan="14"|Players sold or loaned out during the winter transfer market:

|}

Match results

Legend

Pre-season friendlies

Serie A

UEFA Europa League

Coppa Italia

References

2011-12
Italian football clubs 2011–12 season
Palermo